In linguistics, prothesis (from post-classical Latin based on   'placing before'), or less commonly prosthesis (from Ancient Greek   'addition') is the addition of a sound or syllable at the beginning of a word without changing the word's meaning or the rest of its structure. A vowel or consonant added by prothesis is called prothetic or less commonly prosthetic.

Prothesis is different from the adding of a prefix, which changes the meaning of a word.

Prothesis is a metaplasm, a change in spelling or pronunciation. The opposite process, the loss of a sound from the beginning of a word, is called apheresis or aphesis.

Word formation
Prothesis may occur during word formation from
borrowing from foreign languages or the derivation from protolanguages.

Romance languages
A well-known example is that  + stop clusters (known as ), in Latin, gained a preceding  in early Romance languages (Old Spanish, Old French).

Thus, Latin  changed to Spanish  and French ,  (in which the s was later lost) "state"/"been", and Latin  changed to Spanish and Old French  (Modern French  and Italian speciale).

Turkic languages

Some Turkic languages avoid certain combinations of consonants at the beginning of a word. In Turkish, for instance, Smyrna is called İzmir, and the word , borrowed from French, becomes Turkish .

Similarly, in Bashkir, a prosthetic vowel is added to Russian loanwords if a consonant or a consonant cluster appears at the beginning:  "rye" from Russian ,  "table" from Russian ,  "bench" from Russian , etc.

However, Bashkir presents cases of novel prothesis in terms that are inherited from Old Turkic:  "falcon" from Old Turkic lačïn,  "dew" from Old Turkic čïq.

Samoyedic languages

In Nenets, Enets and Nganasan, prothesis of a velar nasal  before vowels has occurred historically: the Nenets words  "road",  "bow" are cognate with Hungarian út, íj with the same meaning.

In some varieties of Nenets, the rule remains productive: the initial syllable cannot start with a vowel, and vowel-initial loanwords are adapted with prothetic .

Hindi
Hindi words from English have an initial i before sp-, sk- or sm-: school → iskuul, special → ispesal, stop → istahp.

Persian
In Persian, loanwords with an initial sp-, st-, sk- or sm- add a short vowel e at the beginning: spray → esprey, stadium → estadiun, Stalin → Estalin, skate → eskeyt, scan → eskan, etc.

Slavic languages
During their evolution from Proto-Slavic, words in some Slavic languages gained a prothetic "v" (spelled "w" in Polish).
 Proto-Slavic *okъno ("window") vs. Ukrainian vikno or Belarusian vakno
 Proto-Slavic *ǫtroba ("internal organs") vs. Polish wątroba ("liver")

Semitic languages
Some Semitic languages, such as Arabic and Hebrew, regularly break up initial two-consonant clusters by adding a prothetic vowel. The vowel may be preceded by the glottal stop /ʔ/ (see aleph) or, in Hebrew, /h/, which may be pronounced or simply written.

Because of the triconsonantal root morphology of Semitic languages, the prothetic vowel may appear regularly when the first two consonants of the root lack an intermediate vowel, such as in verb conjugation: Arabic ʼaktubu (I write) from the verb kataba (root ktb).

In Hebrew, prothesis occurs in nouns of Greek origin, such as Aplaton (Plato), itztadion (stadium).

Consonant mutation

Celtic languages

Welsh features h-prothesis only for vowel-initial words.

Swiss German
Swiss German features n-prothesis if a word ends with a vowel and the next word begins with a vowel. A dropped final n  was originally retained then, but the process now occurs in contexts in which n never existed. A similar process called intrusive-r occurs in some varieties of English.

Sandhi
A prothetic vowel performs external sandhi in Italian: compare  ("the school") vs.  ("at school"). It is, therefore, conjectured both that the origins of the Romance prothesis are phonetical, rather than grammatical. Prothesis originally broke consonant clusters if the preceding word ended in a consonant. There was no prothesis in the Romance dialects that had lost their terminal consonants.

Second language
Phonetic rules of a native language may influence the pronunciation of a second language, including various metaplasms. For example, prothesis is reported for Crimean Tatars when they speak Russian.

James L. Barker writes: "If an Arab, an East Indian, a Frenchman, Spaniard, or Italian is given the following sentence to read: I want to speak Spanish, he reads it in the following manner: I want to speak (i)/(e)Spanish. In this case there is no 'parasitic' i or e before sp of speak, but there is before sp in Spanish".

See also
 Apheresis
 Epenthesis

References

Sources
 Andrei A. Avram, "On the Status of Prothetic Vowels in the Atlantic French Creoles" (pdf file), Antwerp Papers in Linguistics, Issue 107 (2004), ua.ac.be

Sound changes
Phonotactics